The siege of Damietta of 1218–1219 was part of the Fifth Crusade in which the Crusaders attacked the Egyptian port city of Damietta. The city, under the control of the Ayyubid sultan al-Kamil, was besieged in 1218 and taken by the Crusaders in 1219.

At the beginning of the Fifth Crusade, it was agreed that a force would attempt to take Damietta, located at the mouth of the river Nile. The Crusaders then planned to use this city as a launching point for the southern portion of a pincer attack upon Jerusalem from Acre and Suez. Control over the area would also provide wealth to finance the continuation of the crusade, and reduce the threat from the Muslim fleet.

Preparation
In March 1218, the Crusader ships of the Fifth Crusade set sail to the port of Acre. In late May, the forces assigned to besiege Damietta set sail. The first ships arrived on May 27, although the main leaders were delayed by storms and further preparations. The crusading force included groups of Knights Templar and Knights Hospitaller, fleets from Frisia and Italy, and troops amassed under numerous other military leaders.

Siege

Arrival
Upon the arrival of the first Crusader ships to Damietta, Simon III, Count of Saarbrücken was chosen as a temporary leader until the arrival of the remaining ships. Under his command, the force established a landing site on May 29 "without any loss of blood." Later that day, the remaining ships arrived.

The tower of Damietta
The first objective of the Crusaders was to take the defensive river tower that protected the fortress of Damietta and anchored one end of a chain across the harbor. However, the approaches to the tower were limited by the large iron chain to the east, and the shallow depth of the river to the west. Assaults upon the tower began on June 24, but they repeatedly failed. As a result, the Crusaders created a new type of naval siege weaponry, sometimes attributed to the chronicler Oliver of Paderborn; two ships were bound together, and four masts and sailyards were built, with a siege tower and ladder constructed on top. The structure was then covered with a layer of animal skins to protect from enemy attacks. On August 24, the engine was brought to the tower; the next day, the men in the tower surrendered. The use of this remarkable siege engine aided the Crusaders in taking the tower, and opening the way for the fleet to attack the fortress.

The city of Damietta 
The city of Damietta was well fortified, with 3 walls, 28 towers, and a moat.

Once the river tower was captured, the Crusader fleet attempted to support the land forces with an attack on the city from the river. However, Al-Kamil blocked the river with sunken ships, and the crusaders had to spend time clearing out an old canal so that their ships could surround the city. The siege was further slowed by the arrival of winter, storms, disease, and leadership disputes.

In September, Cardinal Pelagius, Bishop of Albano and Legate of the Apostolic See arrived at the Crusader camp and proceeded to challenge the command of John of Brienne, King of Jerusalem, claiming that the Church held greater authority than a secular leader. To add to their difficulties, in late November 1218, a storm wrecked several of the Crusader ships and destroyed supplies.

However, on February 25, 1219, the Crusaders received welcome news. The Sultan Al-Kamil had retreated, leaving the river bank near the city unoccupied by hostile forces. The Crusaders quickly advanced, occupying the city of Tinnis, and spent the spring and summer fighting the Muslim troops with varying success. On August 29, the Crusaders attempted a large-scale attack on the enemy camp, but they quickly became disorganized and the Sultan's counterattack was fairly successful.

Soon after, a temporary truce was established, and peace terms were offered by the Sultan. The terms were highly favourable to the Crusaders; the Muslim leaders had agreed to surrender the city and kingdom of Jerusalem, the Holy Cross, and all Christian captives in Egypt and Damascus, only withholding the fortresses of Kerak and Montreal. They even agreed to supply funds to repair Jerusalem's walls. King John advocated for accepting the peace terms, backed by the French and German troops. On the other hand, Cardinal Pelagius, backed by the Templars, Hospitallers, and Italians, opposed it. Eventually, the terms were denied, and the fighting continued.

In early November 1219, the Crusaders found the city of Damietta nearly unguarded. Upon entering the walls, they found that the town had been devastated by disease and a lack of supplies. The exact numbers are unclear, but out of the 60,000–80,000 inhabitants prior to the beginning of the siege, less than 10,000 remained alive; some sources recount as few as 3,000 left.

Aftermath 
The city of Damietta was held by Crusader forces for another two years after the completion of the siege. During that time, the mosque of Damietta was converted into a cathedral. On February 2, 1220, the Feast of the Purification, Cardinal Pelagius consecrated the building as the Cathedral of the Holy Virgin.

In July 1221, Damietta and the Fifth Crusade were lost. Crusader forces surrendered the city and evacuated Egypt.

List of crusaders present

Adolf VI, Count of Berg
Alamanno da Costa
Aymar de Lairon
Erard II of Chacenay
Gillis Berthout
Guérin de Montaigu
Guido I Embriaco
William of Chartres
Hugh IX of Lusignan
Jacques de Vitry
John de Lacy, Earl of Lincoln
Milo IV du Puiset
Peire de Montagut
Ranulf de Blondeville, Earl of Chester
Raoul of Mérencourt
Renaud de Pons
Robert of Courçon
Robert Fitzwalter
Saer de Quincy, Earl of Winchester
Simone Doria
Walter III of Caesarea
William III, Count of Jülich
Odarique de Michelet

References

Sources
 Cassidy-Welch, Megan. "'O Damietta': War Memory and Crusade in Thirteenth-Century Egypt." Journal of Medieval History 40, no. 3 (June 2, 2014): 346–60. Accessed April 26, 2018. doi:10.1080/03044181.2014.91783.
 Madden, Thomas F. The New Concise History of the Crusades. Lanham, Md: Rowman & Littlefield, 2006. 
 Sterling, Douglas. "Crusader Siege in the Nile Delta." Military History 22, no. 5 (August 2005): 46-52
 Sterling, Douglas. "The Siege of Damietta: Seapower in the Fifth Crusade 1217-1221 A.D." In Crusaders, Condottieri, and Cannon: Medieval Warfare in Societies around the Mediterranean, edited by Donald J. Kagay and L. J. Andrew Villalon, 101–29. Boston: Brill, 2003.
 Oliver of Paderborn. The Capture of Damietta. Translated by John J. Gavigan. Philadelphia: University of Pennsylvania Press, 1948.

Damietta
Damietta 1218
Damietta 1218
Damietta
Damietta
Damietta
13th century in the Ayyubid Sultanate
Damietta 1218